is Toei's twenty-fifth production of the Super Sentai metaseries airing in 2001 and celebrated the franchise's 25th anniversary. 
It aired from February 18, 2001 to February 10, 2002, replacing Mirai Sentai Timeranger and was replaced by Ninpuu Sentai Hurricaneger. Footage from this show was used in the 2002 American series Power Rangers Wild Force and was later dubbed in 2010 as the retitled Power Rangers: Jungle Force for South Korean television in place of Samurai Sentai Shinkenger. Gaoranger aired alongside Kamen Rider Agito.

On May 14, 2018, it was announced that Shout! Factory had licensed Gaoranger for release in North America and it was released on December 18, 2018. This is 11th Super Sentai to be released in North America on DVD in Region 1 format as Jetman was released before Gaoranger.

Plot
A millennia ago, humans fought a war against demon ogres known as the Orgs. With the help of the Power Animals, the ancient Gao Warriors were able to defeat the Orgs' leader Hyakkimaru, sealing the Orgs away along with one of their own. When the seal wanes, the Power Animals select a new generation of Gao Warriors to fight the freed Orgs and protect all life on Earth. The current Gao Warriors, the Gaorangers, are recruited to abandon their civilian lives and names while traveling to find the other Power Animals that were in hiding.

Characters

Gaorangers
He was the last chosen of the Gaorangers, but has an affinity for animals.
He is serious and regimental, deciding that the Gaorangers should refer to each other by color instead of name.
He is the most immature of the team. GaoGiraffe will take GaoShark or GaoBear's place when it is chosen to fight.
He is the physically strongest, but shyest of the team.
She is the youngest and only female of the team.
He used the power of the Dark Wolf Mask to defeat the evil . However, he was turned into  and got the other Gao Warriors to entomb him so he could not do any more harm. He was later awakened as Rouki in the present age, but was freed of his curse by the Gaorangers.

Ogre Tribe Org
The  is a race of oni born from the sadness and madness of humans.
 A crazed pierrot-like master of knives who claimed himself to GaoYellow's greatest rival. He later developed a best friend in Tsue Tsue near the series end.
 An arrogant Org priestess whose magic is as great as her devotion to the Highnesses. She is armed with a staff that spits Org Seeds to resurrect fallen Orgs into giants.

Quests (episodes)

The Fire Mountain Roars
 is the theatrical adaptation of Gaoranger that was a double bill with the Kamen Rider Series film Kamen Rider Agito: Project G4. The film features  and the  combination. The events of the movie takes place between Quests 40 and 41.

Production
The trademark for the series was filed by Toei Company on October 25, 2000.

V-Cinema releases

 (Takes place between Episodes 30 and 31 of Ninpuu Sentai Hurricaneger)

Hyakujuu Sentai Gaoranger vs. Super Sentai

 aired in 2001. The plot revolves around the Gaorangers meeting up with previous sentai members. Each sentai teaches each one about their Super Sentai past. Past Sentai Heroes included Sokichi Banba/Big One from J.A.K.Q. Dengekitai, Yusuke Amamiya/Red Falcon from Choujyu Sentai Liveman, Gouki/Ginga Blue from Seijuu Sentai Gingaman, Daimon Tatsumi/Go Yellow from Kyuukyuu Sentai GoGoFive, and Miku Imamura/Mega Pink from Denji Sentai Megaranger. All the prior Red Rangers from Himitsu Sentai Gorenger to Mirai Sentai Timeranger also make a cameo appearance at the end of the film. The events of the movie takes place between Quests 14 and 15.

Drama CD
A drama CD titled  introduces GaoPanda.

Manga
A manga adaptation crossover with Himitsu Sentai Gorenger titled  was released in September 2001.

Cast
Kakeru Shishi: 
Gaku Washio: 
Kai Samezu: 
Soutaro Ushigome: 
Sae Taiga: 
Tsukumaro Oogami: 
, : 
: 
TsueTsue:

Voice actors
: 
, : 
: 
Yabaiba: 
Rouki: 
: 
: 
: , 
: 
Narrator,

Songs
Opening theme

Lyrics: Nagae Kuwabara
Composition & Arrangement: Kōtarō Nakagawa
Artist: Yukio Yamagata

Lyrics: Nagae Kuwabara
Composition & Arrangement: Kōtarō Nakagawa
Artist: The Gaorangers
Movie opening

Ending themes
 (1–44, 46–50)
Lyrics: Nagae Kuwabara
Composition & Arrangement: Keiichi Oku
Artist: Salia
 (45)
Lyrics: Nagae Kuwabara
Composition & Arrangement: Kōtarō Nakagawa
Artist: The Gaorangers & Yukio Yamagata
 (51)
Lyrics: 
Composition & Arrangement: Kōichirō Kameyama
Artist: The Gaorangers
Finale Ending

International Broadcasts and Home Video
The series was limited to only airing in Asian regions outside of Japan, as most international regions have aired the Power Rangers adaptation, Power Rangers Wild Force instead. This is also the very first Super Sentai season to be released on DVD in its' home country of Japan. Originally released on Rental DVDs starting on October 12, 2001, it would also later be commercially released for sale on DVDs from December 8, 2001 to November 21, 2002, where all 12 volumes had all episodes with the first 10 volumes holding 4 episodes, the last two volumes holding 5. It was also released on VHS from January till December 2002 with those same volumes.
This was the very first Super Sentai series to be released in Vietnam and was given a Vietnamese dub by Phuong Nam Film Studio, where it was released as 5 anh em siêu nhân Gaoranger around 2003-2004. It has saw unprecedented success, paving the way for more Super Sentai seasons to be released in the country. Although the Hyakujuu Sentai Gaoranger vs. Super Sentai film was released as Anh em chiến binh Gao.
The series was released on home video in Thailand with a Thai dub by Rose Home Entertainment (formerly Rose Video) and it was very popular with consumers. It also used to air on Channel 5 during 2003, with distribution by First Entertainment Company.
This was the very first Super Sentai series to air with both Mandarin (Taiwan dialect) and Cantonese dubs at once and premiere within the same year in 2003.
In Taiwan, the series aired with a Taiwanese Mandarin dub on October 3, 2003, until September 26, 2004 with all episodes dubbed, airing on GTV.
In Hong Kong, the series aired with a Cantonese Chinese dub on November 9, 2003 (a month after Taiwan aired the Taiwanese Mandarin dub) on TVB Jade until October 24, 2004 with all episodes covered.
In Malaysia, the series aired with a Malay dub produced by FKN Dubbing on TV2 around 2008 and finished around 2009. It was marketed under Leo Ranger.
In South Korea, the series was dubbed in Korean and aired in 2010 under Power Rangers Jungle Force. (파워레인저 정글포스) They have previously dubbed for its' Power Rangers adaptation that was Wild Force in 2003, although aired under Power Force Rangers. (파워포스레인저) This series was picked up for broadcast after the Korean dub for Engine Sentai Go-Onger in 2009. The reason why they decided to go backwards and dub an earlier Sentai season was because they skipped Samurai Sentai Shinkenger due to the series having heavy use of elements involving Japanese culture. This is currently the only series to have both itself and its American adaptation dubbed for South Korea titled as separate shows.
In North America, the series would receive a DVD release by Shout! Factory on January 30, 2018 in the original Japanese audio with English subtitles. It is the eleventh Super Sentai series to be officially released in the region.

Notes

References

External links

 at Super-Sentai.net

Super Sentai
2001 Japanese television series debuts
2002 Japanese television series endings
Japanese action television series
Japanese fantasy television series
Japanese science fiction television series
Works about legendary creatures
Works about animals
Television series about animals